The Taksin Bridge (usually abbreviated to simply), or commonly known as Sathon Bridge is a bridge crossing the Chao Phraya River in Bangkok, Thailand.

History
It is the sixth bridge built across the Chao Phraya River to link Sathon and Krung Thon Buri Roads in Thonburi side (after Rama VI Bridge, Memorial Bridge, Krung Thon Bridge, Krungthep Bridge, Phra Pin Klao Bridge, chronologically). His Majesty the King Bhumibol Adulyadej (Rama IX) presided over the opening ceremony of the bridge on 6 May 1982 on the occasion of Rattanakosin's 200th anniversary. The bridge was named in honours King Taksin, the founder and ruler of Thonburi Kingdom.

Before the construction of the bridge, the Chao Phraya River was crowded with huge ocean-going steamers, cargo ships, and passenger ships passing up river to the port in the north of Bangkok. After completion of the bridge, the port was moved to the south at Bangkok Port, also known as Khlong Toei Port.

Characteristics
The bridge was designed with a large gap between opposing traffic directions to accommodate a canceled mass transit system. The disused foundations were eventually adapted for the BTS Skytrain, with train services across the bridge beginning on 5 December 1999.

The entry ramp on the east side of the river contains the Saphan Taksin BTS Station as well as Sathorn Pier for the Chao Phraya Express Boat.

See also
Saphan Taksin BTS Station

References

External links
 Taksin Bridge Bureau of Maintenance and Traffic Safety, Thailand. Retrieved on 31 December 2007

Road bridges in Bangkok
Bridges completed in 1982
Crossings of the Chao Phraya River
BTS Skytrain
1982 establishments in Thailand